Rats live on no evil star is a palindrome used in several works. It may refer to:

 Rats Live on no Evil Star (Anyone album), a 1996 album by Anyone (band)
 "Rats Live on No Evil Star", a story in Tales of Pain and Wonder, a 2000 short story collection by Caitlín R. Kiernan
 Ratsliveonnoevilstar, a 2003 EP by Annie Clark
 The Rat Poems: Or, Rats Live On No Evil Star, a 1978 book by Peter Meinke
 No Evil Star, a 2002 film by Marion Coutts